The Ozerov Hasidic dynasty is a Hasidic group that began in 1827 when Rabbi Yehudah Leib Epstein, Rabbi of Ożarów in Poland since 1811, assumed leadership of his Hasidim ("disciples").  Ozerov is known for its learning, as one of the intellectual Hasidic dynasties.

Rabbi Epstein was a disciple of the Seer of Lublin, the Holy Jew of Prshiskhe, the Ohev Yisrael of Apt, Poland, and Rabbi Myer, the Or LaShamayim of Apt. When Rabbi Myer died in 1827, his chasidim asked the Rabbi of Ożarów to be their new rebbe. Rabbi Yehudah Leib accepted this position reluctantly. His followers numbered in the thousands. He moved to Opole towards the end of his life and died in 1837. He was succeeded by his son, Rabbi Yechiel Chaim Epstein. Rabbi Yechiel Chaim was succeeded by his son, Rabbi Arye Yehuda Leib Epstein, author of the Hasidic work Birkas Tov, in 1887. 

Rabbi Arye Yehuda Leib had six children: 
 Grand Rabbi Avraham Shlomo Epstein of Ozharov (1864-1917) (who succeeded his father in 1913), 
 Rabbi Eliezer Shalom Epstein of Partzev, 
 Rabbi Yoseph Epstein of Josefów, 
 Grand Rabbi Alter Moshe David Epstein of Ćmielów, 
 Rabbi Yaakov Epstein, Rebbetzin Chava Rabinowicz (wife of Grand Rabbi Yerachmiel Tzvi Rabinowitz of Biala-Shedlitz), and 
 Rebbetzin Feiga Taub (wife of Rabbi Yaakov Yerachmiel Taub of Radom, brother of Rabbi Israel Taub of Modzhitz).

Rabbi Avraham Shlomo Epstein served as rebbe for only four years, and was succeeded by his son, Rabbi Moshe Yechiel Epstein.  Rabbi Moshe Yechiel Epstein was the son-in-law of Grand Rabbi Chaim Shmuel of Chentshin.

Outline of Ozerov dynasty
Grand Rabbi Yehuda Leib Epstein of Ozharov (d. 23 Teiveis 1837)
Grand Rabbi Yechiel Chaim Epstein (1820-1888), son of Rabbi Yehudah Leib
Grand Rabbi Aryeh Yehuda Leib Epstein of Ozharov (1837-1914), author of Birkas Tov, son of Rabbi Yechiel Chaim
Grand Rabbi Avrohom Shlomo Epstein of Ozharov (1864-1917), author of She'eiris HaBrachah, son of Rabbi Arye Yehuda Leib and son-in-law of Grand Rabbi Chaim Shmuel Horowicz-Szternfeld of Chentshin
Grand Rabbi Moshe Yechiel HaLevi Epstein of Ozerov-Chentchin (1889-1971), author of Eish Dos and Be'er Moshe, son of Rabbi Avrohom Shlomo
Rabbi Dovid Eliyahu Becker of Milwaukee (was not Rebbe), son-in-law of Rabbi Moshe Yechiel Epstein of Ozerov-Chentchin
Grand Rabbi Tanchum Becker of Ozerov-Chentchin (b. 1949), present Ozerover Rebbe, son of Rabbi Dovid Eliyahu Becker and Rebetzin Miriam Becker (daughter of Reb Moshe Yechiel, Zt"l)
Grand Rabbi Alter Moshe David Epstein of Tshmelov, son of Rabbi Arye Yehuda Leib.

See also
 History of the Jews in Poland
 Sarah Horowitz-Sternfeld

References

 בלבת אש Belabas Eish - history of the Ozharov dynasty.
 Y. Alfasi החסידות מדור לדור Hachasidut midor ledor, Jerusalem.
 Ha-Eish-Dos - history of the Eish Dos
 Intro. to Birkas Tov, Y. Becker.
 Oral history of the family, D. Zarmi.

External links
 Text of Sefer Eish Dos Volume 1 in Hebrew, PDF file
 Text of Sefer Eish Dos Volume 2 in Hebrew, PDF file
 A Letter from Grand Rabbi Tanchum Becker of Ozharov-Khentshin concerning the Jewish Cemetery in Ożarów, Poland, and a history of the Ozharover Dynasty

Hasidic dynasties of Poland
Hasidic Judaism in Poland
1827 establishments in the Russian Empire